Rashtrabadi Yuba Morcha is a political party in Nepal. The party is registered with the Election Commission of Nepal ahead of the 2008 Constituent Assembly election.

References

See also

political party 
Nepal 
Election Commission of Nepal

Political parties in Nepal